The 1907–08 Army Cadets men's basketball team represented United States Military Academy during the 1907–08 college men's basketball season. The head coach was Joseph Stilwell, coaching his third season with the Cadets. The team captain was Harvey Higley.

Schedule

|-

References

Army Black Knights men's basketball seasons
Army
Army Cadets Men's Basketball Team
Army Cadets Men's Basketball Team